Jacqueline ("Jackie") Margaret Pereira, OAM (born 29 October 1964 in Perth, Western Australia) is a former field hockey striker from Australia, who competed for her native country in three consecutive Summer Olympics, starting in 1988 (Seoul, South Korea). She was a member of the Australian Women's Hockey Team, best known as the Hockeyroos, that won the gold medals at the 1988 and the 1996 Summer Olympics. She was inducted into the Sport Australia Hall of Fame in 1998.

References

External links
 

1964 births
Living people
Australian female field hockey players
Field hockey players at the 1988 Summer Olympics
Field hockey players at the 1992 Summer Olympics
Field hockey players at the 1996 Summer Olympics
Olympic field hockey players of Australia
Olympic gold medalists for Australia
Olympic medalists in field hockey
Recipients of the Medal of the Order of Australia
Sport Australia Hall of Fame inductees
Medalists at the 1996 Summer Olympics
Medalists at the 1988 Summer Olympics
People educated at Rossmoyne Senior High School
20th-century Australian women